Ophonus rufibarbis is a species of ground beetle that can be found everywhere in Europe and the Near East.

Description
The species is black coloured with brownish legs and antennae.

Distribution
In Belgium, the species can be found in Brussels, Flanders, and Wallonia.
The species was introduced to North America from Europe.

Habitat
It can be found in arable fields, draining soils, hedgerows,  lakeshores and woodlands.

Threat level
As of September 22, 1980 the species is under protection in Flanders.

References

External links
Ophonus rufibarbis on Flickr
Ophonus rufibarbis on Coleoptera.org
Images of Ophonus rufibarbis on Zin.ru

rufibarbis
Beetles of Europe
Beetles described in 1828